Cornelis Vreeswijk (8 August 1937 – 12 November 1987) was a Dutch-born Swedish singer-songwriter, poet and actor.

He emigrated to Sweden with his parents in 1949 at the age of twelve. He was educated as a social worker and hoped to become a journalist, but became increasingly involved in music, performing at events for students with idiosyncratic humor and social engagement. Cornelis Vreeswijk is considered one of the most influential and successful troubadours in Sweden. In 2010 a Swedish drama film, called Cornelis, was made about his life. It was directed by Amir Chamdin.

Early life

Cornelis Vreeswijk was born and grew up in the Netherlands. He emigrated to Sweden with his parents in 1949 at the age of twelve. He left school in 1955 and went to sea, where he passed the time playing the blues. He returned to Sweden in 1959. He was educated as a social worker at Stockholm University and hoped to become a journalist, but became increasingly involved in music, performing at events for students with idiosyncratic humor and social engagement.

Swedish career

Vreeswijk explained in one of his few interviews that he had taught himself to sing and play in the fifties by imitating his first idols Josh White and Lead Belly. His first album, Ballader och oförskämdheter (Ballads and rudenesses, 1964), was a hit which immediately gained him a large following among the emerging radical student generation. In this period he also played with Swedish jazz pianist Jan Johansson and his trio. His songs "Ångbåtsblues" ("Steam Boat Blues") and "Jubelvisa för Fiffiga Nanette" ("Joyful song for Clever Nanette") are classics from these recordings. His abrasive, frequently political lyrics and unconventional delivery were a deliberate break with what he was later to describe as a Swedish song tradition of pretty singing and harmless lyrics, "a hobby for the upper classes". Influenced by jazz and blues and especially by the singing style and social criticism of Georges Brassens, Vreeswijk "speak-sings" his "insults", and compels his listeners to pay close attention to the words.

His 1965 loose translation of Allan Sherman's masterpiece "Hello Muddah, Hello Fadduh" remains beloved to Swedes as "Brev från kolonien" (Letter from the summer camp) decades later, and could be said to have passed into folklore.

A political singer with a bohemian lifestyle, Vreeswijk remained controversial in the sixties and early seventies, idolized by his fans but disapproved of by many others for his "rude" language and persistent interest in "unsuitable" people like prostitutes and criminals. Some of his records were blacklisted by the public broadcasting company Sveriges Radio. During this period, he not only wrote and recorded songs now considered classics, such as "Sportiga Marie" ("Sporty Marie") and several affectionate salutes to the ever less employable "Polaren Pär" ("My Buddy Pär"), but he was an actor on the stage, receiving considerable critical acclaim, most notably as Pilate in the Swedish version of Jesus Christ Superstar, and as Tevye in Fiddler on the Roof. He participated in Melodifestivalen (the Swedish preselection for the Eurovision Song Contest) in 1972 with "Önskar du mig, så önskar jag dig", which finished sixth. He also appeared in movies, including Svarta Palmkronor (Black Palm Trees, 1968), which was filmed on location in Brazil. Spending four months in Brazil began Vreeswijk's lifelong interest in Latin American music and social and political conditions, later seen for example in his Victor Jara album of 1978.

Later in his career, Vreeswijk was to gain increasing fame and a wider audience both for his songs and his other work. He published several volumes of poetry in his lifetime and left a considerable manuscript legacy of poems which have been published since. He also became an important musical interpreter of the works of other people, recording the songs of Carl Michael Bellman, Evert Taube, and Lars Forssell. His fresh, bluesy renderings of Bellman and Taube, who had up to then been classics belonging to the "harmless" tradition that Vreeswijk despised, were artistic and commercial successes which extended his fanbase. The choice of Bellman was significant: Bellman's lively, romantic, pastoral, drinking and sometimes bawdy songs gained Vreeswijk the reputation of being a drunken womaniser, with the association of being "something of a Bellman himself". Like his friend Fred Åkerström, he gave Bellman's songs, "a new and more powerful expression" than they had had before, and like him identifying himself with Bellman's fictional character Fredman, expressing his drunkenness, poverty, and despair, with an intensity that increased in his performances over the years. Bellman's songs featured in many of his performances; two of his albums were dedicated to Bellman's songs, namely the 1971 Spring mot Ulla, spring! Cornelis sjunger Bellman containing 13 of Fredman's Epistles, and the 1977 Movitz! Movitz!, containing 12: the popular Epistle 81, Märk hur vår skugga, appears on both albums.

Vreeswijk's own best-known songs of the later seventies and early eighties tend to be dark in tone, like "Sist jag åkte jumbojet blues" ("Last time I Went by Jumbojet Blues", a metaphorical bad trip) and "Blues för Fatumeh", both addressing heavy drug addiction. Even though in this period Vreeswijk was a prey of tabloid scandal and in the news for his drinking problem and his debts (about both of which he spoke with frankness) rather than for his achievements, he remained highly productive. He is also known as the co-writer of the Hep Stars song "Speleman" which was released for their album Songs We Sang 68.

Towards the end of his life his reputation soared again, aided by the televising of some highly regarded nightclub shows, and by Agneta Brunius' TV documentary Balladen om den flygande holländaren (The Ballad of the Flying Dutchman) in 1986. By the time of his death from liver cancer at the age of fifty, Vreeswijk had become an icon of the Swedish music scene, and he was honored with burial at the cemetery of Katarina kyrka, a national cemetery in Stockholm. In 2010, Cornelis, a movie about his life, premiered in Swedish cinemas. Norwegian singer Hans Erik Dyvik Husby (previously in Turbonegro) played the role of Vreeswijk.

Dutch career 

In 1966, the Dutch broadcasting organisation VARA invited Vreeswijk to the Netherlands. He translated several of his songs into Dutch, and wrote a couple of new ones. One of his songs, "De nozem en de non" ("The Greaser and the Nun"), was released as a single, without much popular success. His first Dutch album was only released in 1972, after ten successful Swedish albums. 100,000 copies of Cornelis Vreeswijk were sold, and the single "Veronica" became a big hit after it was picked up by the pirate radio station Veronica. His old song "De nozem en de non" was then re-recorded and released with much success. His later albums could not match the success of the first one, and Vreeswijk never achieved the fame in the Netherlands that he did in Sweden.

Nowadays, only "De nozem en de non" is still known by the general Dutch public. Vreeswijk still has some fans in the Netherlands, however, and in 2000 the Cornelis Vreeswijk society was founded.

One reason for his lack of popularity in the Netherlands was the impression that he was a bit old-fashioned. Because of his long stay in Sweden, though he never became a citizen, the Dutch pronunciation and idiom that he had learned to speak in his youth were out-of-date in the seventies and eighties.

Although he was fluent in both Dutch and Swedish, the latter became his primary language. His Stockholm-accented Swedish was famously witty and expressive, and in an interview he once suggested that the process of learning the language in his teens might have energized his use of it: "It doesn't just fall over you like when you're a baby and fed daily with words and food. You become freer, less respectful. ... Swedish is such a different language. Pure, distinct, beautiful. It has few synonyms. But they're many enough for me".

Later life

He gave his last concert in Uppsala in September 1987, suffering from cancer and diabetes. He recorded his last album and a book of poetry, both entitled Till Fatumeh. He travelled one last time to the Netherlands to see his family, returned to Stockholm and died soon afterwards.

Discography

Swedish 
Main article – Cornelis Vreeswijk's Swedish discography

Dutch 
1972 – Cornelis Vreeswijk
1973 – Leven en laten leven
1974 – Liedjes voor de Pijpendraaier en mijn Zoetelief
1976 – Foto's en een souvenir: Vreeswijk zingt Croce
1977 – Het recht om in vrede te leven
1978 – Het beste van Cornelis Vreeswijk
1982 – Ballades van de gewapende bedelaar
2005 - " Het Mooiste van Cornelis Vreeswijk"

Bibliography 
En handfull gräs, 1970.
I stället för vykort, 1974. 
Felicias svenska suite, 1978. 
Till Fatumeh, 1987. 
Till Fatumeh (paperback), 1989. 
Sånger, ed. Jan-Erik Vold, 1988. 
Dikter, ed. Jan-Erik Vold, 1989. 
Osjungna sånger, 1990. 
Skrifter, ed. Jan-Erik Vold, 2000:
Samlade sånger. 
Enskilda sånger. 
Dikter Prosa Tolkningar. 

Anthology
En bok om Cornelis (chosen texts, articles and interviews), Ordfront Förlag, 2000. 

Also appears on
Beginner's Guide to Scandinavia (3 CDs, Nascente 2011)

References

Sources
Rolf Fridholm, Polarn Cornelis, 1989. 
Klas Widén, Cornelis Vreeswijk: En förteckning över hans produktion med kort biografi, 1991.
Ulf Carlsson, Cornelis Vreeswijk: Artist-vispoet-lyriker, 1996. 
Rolf Fridholm, Medborgare! En vänbok om Cornelis, 1996. 
Oscar Hedlund, Scener ur en äventyrares liv, 2000. 

Klas Gustafson, Ett bluesliv_: Berättelsen om Cornelis Vreeswijk, 2006.

External links 
 
Swedish Cornelis Vreeswijk Society (Cornelis Vreeswijk Sällskapet)
Dutch Cornelis Vreeswijk homepage

1937 births
1987 deaths
Dutch emigrants to Sweden
People from Velsen
Swedish songwriters
Melodifestivalen contestants
Interpreters of Carl Michael Bellman's works
20th-century Swedish male singers